Streptomyces lydicamycinicus is a bacterium species from the genus of Streptomyces. Streptomyces lydicamycinicus produces the antibiotic lydicamycin.

See also 
 List of Streptomyces species

References 

lydicamycinicus
Bacteria described in 2020